The Albina Ministerial Alliance is organization of pastors based in Portland, Oregon, representing predominantly African American congregations since in the 1960s. The group has a Coalition for Justice and Police Reform. According to The Skanner Saundra Sorenson, the Coalition "has a long history of working on a deep policy level to effect change in local law enforcement practices, often in response to police killings".

History
The group hosted John Lewis in Portland in 1989. Civl rights activist Allen Bethel serves as president, as of 2020.

References

Organizations based in Portland, Oregon